Bellview is an unincorporated community in Cherokee County, in the U.S. state of North Carolina. It is part of Notla Township, and is located immediately north of the Georgia border, about 10 miles south of Murphy, NC. Its average elevation is 1800 feet (549 m) above sea level. U.S. Route 19 is the main highway through Bellview.

History
A schoolhouse, Bellview Academy, was established at Bellview in the 1870s. A variant name is "Bell View".

References

Unincorporated communities in North Carolina
Unincorporated communities in Cherokee County, North Carolina